Silas Dustin (1855 – 1940) was an artist, art dealer and curator of the National Academy of Design in New York

Biography
Dustin was born in Richmond, Ohio although he is known as a California painter. He studied under William Merritt Chase in New York City. Dustin became the curator of the National Academy of Design in New York before leading the Biltmore Salon. Dustin died in 1940.

References

1855 births
1940 deaths
American art curators
Painters from Ohio
Students of William Merritt Chase
National Academy of Design people
People from Jefferson County, Ohio